= MT Pacific Cobalt =

Singaporean oil tanker

History
- Name: Pacific Cobalt
- Owner: (Singapore) Eastern Pacific Shipping
- Port of registry: Liberia
- Completed: 2020
- Identification: IMO number: 9788617

General characteristics
- Class & type: Tanker
- Tonnage: 49,886 DWT
- Length: 182.5 m (598 ft 9 in)
- Beam: 32 m (105 ft 0 in)
- Draught: 7.6 m (24 ft 11 in)

MT Pacific Cobalt is a Singaporean oil tanker built in 2020 and owned by Eastern Pacific Shipping. It is one of the first and largest ships to be installed with an onboard filtration and carbon capture system.

== Description ==
Pacific Cobalt is a 49,700 DWT oil and chemical tanker with an overall length of 182.5 m (599 ft). It is 32 m (105 ft) wide and has an average draft of 7.6 m (25 ft). It has an identical sister ship named Pacific Gold.

== History ==
In May 2022, Eastern Pacific Shipping announced that it would be working with the Netherlands-based maritime carbon capture company Value Maritime to install prefabricated "Filtree" systems. The installation was finished in February 2023 after a seventeen-day construction period, and Pacific Cobalt steamed from Rotterdam to Venice shortly after the installation was completed.
